The Social Contract, originally published as On the Social Contract; or, Principles of Political Right, is a 1762 French-language book by the Genevan philosopher Jean-Jacques Rousseau. The book theorizes about the best way to establish a political community in the face of the problems of commercial society, which Rousseau had already identified in his Discourse on Inequality (1755).

The Social Contract helped inspire political reforms or revolutions in Europe, especially in France. The Social Contract argued against the idea that monarchs were divinely empowered to legislate. Rousseau asserts that only the people, who are sovereign, have that all-powerful right.

Overview

The epigraph of the work is "foederis aequas / dicamus leges" Let us set equal terms for the truce. (Virgil, Aeneid XI.321–22). The stated aim of The Social Contract is to determine whether there can be a legitimate political authority since people's interactions he saw at his time seemed to put them in a state far worse than the good one they were at in the state of nature, even though living in isolation.  He concludes book one, chapter three with, "Let us then admit that force does not create right, and that we are obliged to obey only legitimate powers", which is to say, the ability to coerce is not a legitimate power―might does not make right, and the people have no duty to submit to it. A state has no right to enslave a conquered people.

In this desired social contract, everyone will be free because they all forfeit the same number of rights and impose the same duties on all. Rousseau argues that it is absurd for a man to surrender his freedom for slavery; thus, the participants must have a right to choose the laws under which they live. Although the contract imposes new laws, including those safeguarding and regulating property, there are restrictions on how that property can be legitimately claimed.  His example with land includes three conditions; that the land be uninhabited, that the owner claims only what is needed for subsistence, and that labour and cultivation give the possession legitimacy.

Rousseau posits that the political aspects of a society should be divided into two parts. First, there must be a sovereign consisting of the whole population, which included women (in a way that was not practiced by almost all countries and so was quite revolutionary to suggest), that represents the general will and is the legislative power within the state.  The second division is that of the government, being distinct from the sovereign. This division is necessary because the sovereign cannot deal with particular matters like applications of the law.  Doing so would undermine its generality, and therefore damage its legitimacy. Thus, the government must remain a separate institution from the sovereign body. When the government exceeds the boundaries set in place by the people, it is the mission of the people to abolish such government and begin anew.

Rousseau claims that the size of the territory to be governed often decides the nature of the government. Since a government is only as strong as the people, and this strength is absolute, the larger the territory, the more strength the government must be able to exert over the populace. In his view, a monarchical government is able to wield the most power over the people since it has to devote less power to itself, while a democracy the least. In general, the larger the bureaucracy, the more power required for government discipline. Normally, this relationship requires the state to be an aristocracy or monarchy. When Rousseau uses the word democracy, he refers to a direct democracy rather than a representative democracy. In light of the relation between population size and governmental structure, Rousseau argues that like his native Geneva, small city-states are the form of the nation in which freedom can best flourish. For states of this size, an elected aristocracy is preferable, and in very large states a benevolent monarch; but even monarchical rule, to be legitimate, must be subordinate to the sovereign rule of law.

A remarkable peculiarity of The Social Contract is its logical rigor that Rousseau learned in his twenties from mathematics:

Reception 

The French philosopher Voltaire used his publications to criticise and mock Rousseau, but also to defend free expression. In his Idées républicaines (1765), he reacted to the news that The Social Contract had been burned in Geneva, saying "The operation of burning it was perhaps as odious as that of writing it. […] To burn a book of argument is to say: 'We do not have enough wit to reply to it.'" The work was also banned in Paris.

The work received a refutation called The Confusion of the Social Contract by Jean-Jacques Rousseau by the Jesuit Alfonso Muzzarelli in Italy in 1794.

The influence of Rousseau on Maximilien Robespierre from his diary during the Estates-General of 1789:

Thomas Carlyle assessed its impact:and now has not Jean Jacques promulgated his new Evangel of a Contrat Social; explaining the whole mystery of Government, and how it is contracted and bargained for,—to universal satisfaction? Theories of Government! Such have been, and will be; in ages of decadence. Acknowledge them in their degree; as processes of Nature, who does nothing in vain; as steps in her great process. Meanwhile, what theory is so certain as this, That all theories, were they never so earnest, painfully elaborated, are, and, by the very conditions of them, must be incomplete, questionable, and even false? Thou shalt know that this Universe is, what it professes to be, an infinite one. Attempt not to swallow it, for thy logical digestion; be thankful, if skilfully planting down this and the other fixed pillar in the chaos, thou prevent its swallowing thee. That a new young generation has exchanged the Sceptic Creed, What shall I believe? for passionate Faith in this Gospel according to Jean Jacques is a further step in the business; and betokens much.He advised: "In such prophesied Lubberland, of Happiness, Benevolence, and Vice cured of its deformity, trust not, my friends! . . . Is not Sentimentalism twin-sister to Cant, if not one and the same with it? Is not Cant the materia prima of the Devil; from which all falsehoods, imbecilities, abominations body themselves; from which no true thing can come? For Cant is itself properly a double-distilled Lie; the second-power of a Lie."

See also
 George Mason Memorial, Washington, D.C., includes Du Contract Social as an element of the statue of a seated Mason.

References

Further reading 
 Bertram, Christopher (2003). Rousseau and the 'Social Contract'''. Routledge.
 Incorvati, Giovanni (2012) “Du contrat social, or the principles of political right(s). Les citoyens de Rousseau ont la parole en anglais”, in : G. Lobrano, P.P. Onida, Il principio della democrazia. Jean-Jacques Rousseau Du Contrat social (1762), Napoli, Jovene, p. 213-256.
 Williams, David Lay (2014). Rousseau's 'Social Contract': An Introduction.  Cambridge University Press.
 Wraight, Christopher D. (2008). Rousseau's The Social Contract: A Reader's Guide. London: Continuum Books.

External links

 Du contrat social (MetaLibri)
 The Social Contract translated 1782 by G. D. H. Cole at constitution.org
 The Social Contract Public domain audiobook G. D. H. Cole translation
 The Social Contract English translation audiobook on LibriVox.org
 Catholic Encyclopedia Based on an article critical of The Social Contract'', written in 1908.
 SparkNotes entry on The Social Contract
 Rousseaus Gesellschaftsvertrag in Kurzform
 A site containing The Social Contract, slightly modified for easier reading
 
 Du contrat social, or the principles of political right(s)

1762 books
Books about sovereignty
Philosophy books
Social philosophy literature
Works by Jean-Jacques Rousseau